Brandon Plaza Hernandéz (born 22 October 1996) is a Mexican taekwondo athlete. He won the gold medal at the 2018 Pan Am Taekwondo Championships.

He won one of the bronze medals in the men's flyweight event at the 2022 World Taekwondo Championships held in Guadalajara, Mexico.

References 

1996 births
Living people
Mexican male taekwondo practitioners
Pan American Games medalists in taekwondo
Pan American Games silver medalists for Mexico
Taekwondo practitioners at the 2019 Pan American Games
World Taekwondo Championships medalists
Pan American Taekwondo Championships medalists
Medalists at the 2019 Pan American Games
Sportspeople from Guanajuato
People from Comonfort
21st-century Mexican people